Matheus Nolasco de Oliveira Silva (born 21 April 1995), known as Matheus Nolasco or Somália, is a Brazilian footballer who plays for Capivariano as a forward.

Club career
Born in Brasília, Distrito Federal, Matheus Nolasco was an Atlético Mineiro youth graduate. In 2015, after finishing his formation, he was released and joined Penapolense.

In March 2015, after a trial period, Matheus Nolasco was loaned to Vila Nova until the end of the year. In July, after appearing in only two matches as a substitute in the Campeonato Goiano Segunda Divisão, he returned to his parent club and appeared in the year's Copa Paulista.

On 2 February 2016, Matheus Nolasco was loaned to Santos until December 2017, being initially assigned to the B-team. He made his first team – and Série A – debut on 14 May, replacing Ronaldo Mendes in the 64th minute of a 0–1 away loss against Atlético Mineiro.

Career statistics

References

External links
Futebol de Goyaz profile 

1995 births
Living people
Footballers from Brasília
Brazilian footballers
Association football forwards
Campeonato Brasileiro Série A players
Campeonato Brasileiro Série D players
Clube Atlético Penapolense players
Vila Nova Futebol Clube players
Santos FC players
Associação Portuguesa de Desportos players
Clube Atlético Linense players
Rio Claro Futebol Clube players
Capivariano Futebol Clube players